Lawhitton is a village in the civil parish of Lawhitton Rural, in east Cornwall, England, United Kingdom. The village is situated two miles (3 km) southwest of Launceston and half-a-mile west of Cornwall's border with Devon at the River Tamar.

Governance 
The civil parish of Lawhitton was abolished in 1894 and the parishes of Lawhitton Urban and Lawhitton Rural were created. On the 1 April 1922 Lawhitton Urban was abolished into Launceston parish. In 1891 the civil parish of Lawhitton had a population of 361. The parish of Lawhitton Rural is in the Launceston registration district. It is a comparatively small parish and Lawhitton village is the principal settlement. The border with Devon forms the parish's eastern boundary; to the north, it is bounded by St Thomas by Launceston parish; to the west by Launceston parish; and to the south by Lezant parish. The population of Lawhitton Rural in the 2001 census was 270, decreasing to 232 at the 2011 census.

History

At the time of Domesday Book (1086) the manor was held by the bishop and had 11 hides of land and land for 40 ploughs. The lord had land for 2 ploughs with 7 serfs, and 27 villeins and 20 smallholders had land for 29 ploughs. There was 8 acres of meadow, 100 acres of pasture and 10 acres of underwood. The value of the manor was £17 though it had formerly been worth only £8.

Until 1261 the benefice of Lawhitton consisted of a vicarage and a sinecure rectory; they were then combined as a rectory. From then until 1924 there were 60 rectors, of whom probably only 19 were resident. The last of these rectors was Henry Du Boulay who was concurrently Archdeacon of Bodmin from 1892 to 1924 Du Boulay was ordained in 1864 and died in 1925; he was the son of an earlier rector of Lawhitton.

There is a Cornish cross at Treniffle; it was found built into an old barn at Tregada Farm about 1883 and then placed in her garden by Mrs. Morshead.

Parish church

The plan is unusual and the tower stands in the position of a south transept. The tower is 13th century in date and there is a north aisle. The font is Norman, of the Altarnun type. Features of interest include the Jacobean pulpit, 1665, and two monuments, to R. Bennet (d. 1683) and in Coade stone to Richard Bennet-Coffin (d. 1796).

Bennett-Coffin family

Richard Bennet (d.1619), a Councillor at Law, built Hexworthy House as his seat within the parish. The Bennet family originated in Sussex and settled at Hexworthy during the reign of Queen Elizabeth I (1558-1603). His son was Col. Robert Bennet (1605–1683) of Hexworthy, a Member of Parliament during the Civil War and a noted commander of the Parliamentarian forces. His descendant Richard Bennett-Coffin (d.1796) was the son of Edward Bennett of Lawhitton by his wife Honor Coffin (born 1682), 11th daughter of Richard Coffin (1623-1700) of Portledge in the parish of Alwington in North Devon, lord of the manor of Alwington and Sheriff of Devon in 1683. Richard Bennett-Coffin (d.1796) became heir to the Coffin estates following the death of his childless uncle Richard Coffin (1684-1766). The Coffin family had been established at Alwington since the reign of King Henry II (1154-1189), and remained there in unbroken male succession until 1766. He adopted the name and arms of Coffin, but died without progeny at Esher in Surrey and was buried at Lawhitton where survives his monument.  His heir was Rev. John Pine-Coffin (1735-1824), eldest surviving grandson of Dorothy Coffin (1651-1690), eldest daughter of Richard Coffin (1623-1700), who in 1672 married Edward Pyne (1648-1675) of East Down. Her descendants remained seated at East Down manor house until 1866, the Pyne family having occupied it since the 13th century. The last in the Pine-Coffin family to occupy Portledge manor house was Richard Geoffrey Pine-Coffin (1908-1974).

Famous inhabitant
James Ruse 1759-1837 from the area was aboard the first fleet of convicts into Sydney cove in 1788. He went on to become a celebrated farming pioneer

References

Villages in Cornwall
Former civil parishes in Cornwall